Gold and Ivory (Spanish:Oro y marfil) is a 1947 Spanish film directed by Gonzalo Delgrás.

Sinopsys
A rich andalusian playboy (Cabré) falls in love with a poor singer (Mistral) but everything goes wrong. Years later she has a great success and they meet again.

Cast
 Mario Cabré
 Rafael Calvo Gutiérrez as Presentador de artistas  
 Leonor María G. de Castro 
 Emilio Fábregas as Catador de vinos  
 Francisco Linares-Rivas as Administrador de La Pandereta  
 Carmen Llanos 
 Nati Mistral 
 Fernando Porredón 
 Domingo Rivas as Diego Cortés  
 Flora Soler
 José Suárez 
 Rosita Valero as Chica con flor

References

Bibliography 
  Eva Woods Peiró. White Gypsies: Race and Stardom in Spanish Musical Films. U of Minnesota Press, 2012.

External links 
 

1947 comedy films
Spanish comedy films
1947 films
1940s Spanish-language films
Films directed by Gonzalo Delgrás
Spanish black-and-white films
1940s Spanish films